Ramiz Mammadov (born 15 August 1968) is an Azerbaijani former football player. Sometimes he is confused with his Muscovite colleague Ramiz Mamedov.

He played between 1992 and 2005, for teams such as FC Kapaz (Ganja), Garabag (Agdam), Kur (Mingacevir), Shafa (Baku), and Turan (Tovuz).  Toward the end of his career, he played in Iran.  He also competed internationally for Azerbaijan.

Career statistics

International career
Mammadov's only goal for Azerbaijan came on 27 July 2000 in a 1–2 defeat to Macedonia.

International statistics

International Goals

Manager career 
Mammadov was the head coach for Gabala, before being replaced by ex-England defender Tony Adams.

After leaving Gabala, Mammadov went on to become manager of FC Atyrau at the start of the 2011 Kazakhstan Premier League season. Shortly after taking over as manager of Atyrau, Mammadov caused controversy by stating that Armenian forward Tigran Gharabaghtsyan would not play for the club as long as he is manager. Mammadov resigning as manager after their round 15th match against Tobol on 12 June 2011.

On 24 September 2012, Mammadov was re-appointed as manager of Gabala, replacing the sacked Fatih Kavlak. Mammadov was again sacked as manager of Gabala on 2 April 2013.

Manager statistics

Honours
 Kapaz
Azerbaijan Cup (1) - 1999–2000
 Shafa Baku
Azerbaijan Cup (1) - 2000–2001

References

External links
 

1968 births
Living people
People from Agdam
Azerbaijani footballers
Azerbaijan international footballers
Azerbaijani expatriate footballers
Association football defenders
Azerbaijani football managers
Azerbaijani expatriate football managers
Turan-Tovuz IK players
Pegah Gilan players
Expatriate footballers in Iran
Gabala FC managers
Expatriate football managers in Kazakhstan
Expatriate football managers in Iran
Sportspeople from Agdam
Footballers from Agdam